The junior men's trials, 20 inch is a trials event at the annual UCI Urban Cycling World Championships. It has been a UCI World Championship event since 1986. From 1986 to 1994 there was no separate 26-inch junior category in the world championships.

From 1986 to 1999, the UCI world championships in trials were run as the UCI Trials World Championships. From 2000 to 2016, the world championships in trials were held alongside other mountain-biking disciplines as the UCI Mountain Bike & Trials World Championships. Beginning in 2017, the UCI trials world championships will be run as part of the UCI Urban Cycling World Championships.

Medalists

Medal table

References

Events at the UCI Mountain Bike & Trials World Championships